Pivenfrine (INN), also known as pivalylphenylephrine, is a sympathomimetic and mydriatic agent.

See also
 Phenylephrine

References

Alpha-1 adrenergic receptor agonists
Phenylethanolamines
Pivalate esters
Sympathomimetics